Continuous descent approach (CDA), also known as optimized profile descent (OPD), is a method by which aircraft approach airports prior to landing. It is designed to reduce fuel consumption and noise compared to other conventional descents. Instead of approaching an airport in a stairstep fashion, throttling down, and requesting permission to descend to each new (lower) altitude, CDA allows for a smooth, constant-angle descent to landing.

A continuous descent approach starts from the top of descent, i.e., at cruise altitude, and allows the aircraft to fly its individual optimal vertical profile down to runway threshold. Some airports apply constraints to this individual optimal profile.

United Kingdom
The approach to London Heathrow Airport uses CDA, particularly at night, to minimize noise pollution. It is also used at Gatwick Airport.

References

Air traffic control